The Disappearance of Christina is a 1993 television film, starring John Stamos, Kim Delaney, CCH Pounder, Robert Carradine and Claire Yarlett. It was written by Camille Thomasson and directed by Karen Arthur.

Plot Summary
Joe and Mike are workaholics who don't seem to pay much attention to their wives.  Joe and his wife, Christina are a couple on the verge of divorce.
  
On a boat trip, Christina vanishes and Joe becomes the main suspect for her assumed "murder" but he knows he didn't do it.  He also doesn't believe she is dead, especially when Mike's wife reveals that he and Christina may have been having an affair.  When Joe tries to investigate, strange things start to happen as he finds disturbing information about his wife's past.

Cast
 John Stamos as Joe Seldon
 Kim Delaney as Lilly Kroft
 CCH Pounder as Detective Davis
 Robert Carradine as Michael Croft
 Claire Yarlett as Christina Seldon

Reception
TV Guide gave the film only one star out of five and stated: "A made-for-cable-TV feature released to home video, THE DISAPPEARANCE OF CHRISTINA is a frustrating suspense drama, mostly formula until a surprise conclusion that's only a surprise because there's no surprise." Dominic Griffin from Variety magazine wrote: "John Stamos stars in this murder mystery about a man whose life falls apart after his wife disappears and he's accused of her murder. What could have been a generic missing-persons movie is vastly improved by some exciting and interesting story twists."

References

External links
 
 

1993 films
1993 television films
American television films
Films scored by David Michael Frank
Films directed by Karen Arthur
1990s English-language films